Espoir City (Japanese: エスポワールシチー, foaled  April 22nd, 2005) is a Japanese Thoroughbred racehorse and the winner of the 2010 February Stakes.

Career
Espoir City debuted on March 9, 2008, at Hanshin, where he came in 3rd. He got his first win after six races on July 29, 2008, when he won at Kokura. He then picked up another win at Kokura on August 10, 2008. This sparked a 4 race winstreak.

2009 was a very successful year for Espoir City. He went on a 6 race winstreak. He picked up his first graded win on March 29, 2009, when he won the  March Stakes. He then won his first Grade-1 race by winning the May 5th, 2009 Kashiwa Kinen.

He won the Mile Championship Nambu Hai on October 12, 2009, and his Grade-1 win, the 2009  Champions Cup in December.

He started off 2010 with another Grade-1 win, this time at the February 21st, 2010 February Stakes. He then successfully defended his Kashiwa Kinen title on May 5, 2010, to cap off his win streak.

His next win came on March 21, 2011, when he won the Nagoya Taishoten. He tried to defend his Kashiwa Kinen title for a 2nd time in May, but came in 3rd place. He was only able to win one more race in 2011, when he captured the November 2011 Miyako Stakes.

He returned to the Kashiwa Kinen on May 2, 2012, and won the race for the 3rd and final time. Later in October, he also re-captured the Mile Championship Nambu Hai.

2013 was Espoir City's final year in racing. He came in 2nd at the 2013 February Stakes and at the 2013 Kashiwa Kinen. He then won the Mile Championship Nambu Hai for the 3rd and final time in October. His last win was the November 4th, 2013 Japan Breeding farms' Cup Sprint. He finished his career with a 3rd place finish at the  Champions Cup on December 1, 2013.

Stud career
Espoir City's descendants include:

c = colt, f = filly

Pedigree

References

2005 racehorse births
Racehorses bred in Japan
Racehorses trained in Japan
Thoroughbred family 4-m